Same-sex marriage in Oklahoma has been legal since October 6, 2014, following the resolution of a lawsuit challenging the state's ban on same-sex marriage. On that day, following the U.S. Supreme Court's refusal to review Bishop v. Smith, a case that had found the ban unconstitutional, the Tenth Circuit Court of Appeals ordered Oklahoma to recognize same-sex marriages. On January 14, 2014, Judge Terence C. Kern of the U.S. District Court for the Northern District of Oklahoma declared the state's statutory and constitutional same-sex marriage bans unconstitutional. The case, Bishop v. Smith (formerly Bishop v. Oklahoma and Bishop v. United States), was stayed pending appeal. On July 18, 2014, a panel of the Tenth Circuit upheld Kern's ruling overturning Oklahoma's same-sex marriage ban. However, the panel put its ruling on hold pending disposition of a petition for certiorari by the U.S. Supreme Court. On October 6, 2014, the U.S. Supreme Court rejected the request for review, leaving the Tenth Circuit Court's ruling in place. State officials responded by implementing the Tenth Circuit's ruling, recognizing same-sex marriage in the state.

Legal history

Restrictions
In 1975, the Oklahoma Legislature passed its first statute defining marriage as between "one man and one woman". In 1996, the Oklahoma Legislature passed another piece of legislation, defining marriage as between "one man and one woman" and prohibiting same-sex marriages performed out-of-state from being recognized in Oklahoma.

In April 2004, the Oklahoma Senate, by a vote of 38 to 7, and the Oklahoma House of Representatives, by a vote of 92 to 4, approved a constitutional amendment banning same-sex marriage. On November 2, 2004, Oklahoma voters approved the ban as Question 711. The amendment added a ban on same-sex marriage and any "legal incidents thereof be conferred upon unmarried couples or groups", such as civil unions or domestic partnerships, to the Constitution of Oklahoma.

Non-binding resolution
In April 2013, the Oklahoma House of Representatives passed HCR 1009, a non-binding resolution reaffirming marriage as "between one man and one woman", and urging the U.S. Supreme Court to uphold Section 3 of the Defense of Marriage Act (DOMA) and the right of states to regulate marriage. It passed 84–0, with 71 Republicans and 13 Democrats voting in favor. 16 Democrats walked out of the chamber instead of voting in protest. The Oklahoma Senate approved the resolution later that same month. The U.S. Supreme Court struck down Section 3 of DOMA in United States v. Windsor on June 26, 2013.

Bishop v. Smith

Background
On November 3, 2004, the day after Oklahoma voters overwhelmingly approved a constitutional amendment banning same-sex marriage, two lesbian couples, Mary Bishop and Sharon Baldwin, and Susan Barton and Gay Phillips, filed a challenge in federal district court in Tulsa. The first couple had been denied a marriage license by the Tulsa County Clerk, Sally Howe Smith, while the latter couple had formed a Vermont civil union in 2001 and married in British Columbia in 2005 while deliberations were pending. They were represented by Holladay and Chilton, an Oklahoma City law firm. Smith was represented by Tulsa County's district attorney and the Alliance Defending Freedom, a non-profit Christian advocacy organization. The case was Bishop v. Oklahoma. The defendants were the Attorney General of Oklahoma, Drew Edmondson, Governor Brad Henry, the U.S. Attorney General, John Ashcroft, and President George W. Bush. The couples sought, inter alia, a declaration that the Oklahoma Amendment was unconstitutional under the Due Process, Equal Protection, Full Faith and Credit and Privileges and Immunities clauses of the U.S. Constitution. They also challenged the federal Defense of Marriage Act (DOMA), passed in 1996. The state sought to dismiss, arguing that the couples lacked standing and their suit was barred by the Eleventh Amendment.

On July 20, 2006, Judge Terence C. Kern issued a partial victory to the plaintiffs, holding that they could litigate various challenges to the state constitutional amendment; however, he reduced the scope of the case by eliminating certain legal theories from consideration. Citing Smelt v. Orange County, a California case, he ruled that the couples lacked standing to challenge DOMA as neither had entered into a legal marriage in the United States. Kern ruled that Bishop and Baldwin lacked standing to challenge the portion of DOMA that excluded same-sex marriage from being recognized by the federal government because they were not married. However, he ruled that Barton Philips did have standing, as the couple had married in Canada and entered into a civil union in Vermont, and so determined that it would be premature to dismiss their claims. Kern found that both couples had standing to challenge the state amendment prohibiting same-sex marriage, since both were interested in being legally married in Oklahoma. State officials appealed to the Tenth Circuit Court of Appeals. The Tenth Circuit issued an unpublished decision on June 5, 2009, reversing the district court's failure to dismiss the claims against the Oklahoma officials, and dismissed the plaintiffs' claims for lack of subject-matter jurisdiction. The remaining defendants, Smith and the United States, filed a motion to dismiss on October 13, 2009.

On February 25, 2011, prior to the court issuing a decision on the motions to dismiss, the United States notified the court that it would cease defending the constitutionality of Section 3 of DOMA. The Bipartisan Legal Advisory Group of the United States House of Representatives sought to intervene to defend DOMA. On June 26, 2013, the U.S. Supreme Court ruled in United States v. Windsor that Section 3 of DOMA violated the Due Process Clause of the Fifth Amendment. That same day, the court also ruled in Hollingsworth v. Perry, allowing same-sex marriages to resume in California.

District court decision
On January 14, 2014, Judge Kern granted summary judgement to the plaintiffs and ruled in the case, now Bishop v. United States, that Oklahoma's ban on same-sex marriage was unconstitutional under the Equal Protection Clause of the Fourteenth Amendment. He issued an order permanently enjoining enforcement of the state's same-sex marriage ban, but stayed enforcement of his judgement pending appeal, citing the U.S. Supreme Court's issuance of a stay in a nearly identical case in Utah, Kitchen v. Herbert. Kern wrote that the U.S. Supreme Court's dismissal of a similar case, Baker v. Nelson, in 1972 was not binding precedent because "there have been significant doctrinal developments in Supreme Court jurisprudence since 1972 indicating that these issues would now present a substantial question". He found that two of the plaintiffs, Barton and Phillips, lacked standing to challenge Section 2 of DOMA because the federal officials they named as defendants had no responsibility for its enforcement and the record did not show that Oklahoma officials had failed to recognize Barton and Phillips' marriage in other jurisdictions. He noted that the couple "ha[d] played an important role in the overall legal process leading to invalidation of Section 3 of DOMA" and praised them and their attorneys "for their foresight, courage, and perseverance". Kern agreed with Bishop and Baldwin that the Oklahoma constitutional amendment banning same-sex marriage violated the Equal Protection Clause. He applied rational basis review and found the state's justifications, including encouraging responsible procreation, optimal child-rearing and the impact on the institution of marriage, "inadequate". Kern ruled that the constitutional amendment was "an arbitrary, irrational exclusion of just one class of Oklahoma citizens from a governmental benefit". Of the Supreme Court's jurisprudence on the issue of discrimination based on sexual orientation and equal protection, the decision said: "The Supreme Court has not expressly reached the issue of whether state laws prohibiting same-sex marriage violate the U.S. Constitution. However, Supreme Court law now prohibits states from passing laws that are born of animosity against homosexuals, extends constitutional protection to the moral and sexual choices of homosexuals, and prohibits the federal government from treating opposite-sex marriages and same-sex marriages differently. There is no precise legal label for what has occurred in Supreme Court jurisprudence beginning with Romer in 1996 and culminating in Windsor in 2013, but this Court knows a rhetorical shift when it sees one."

Governor Mary Fallin responded to the decision by stating, "I support the right of Oklahoma's voters to govern themselves on this and other policy matters. I am disappointed in the judge's ruling and troubled that the will of the people has once again been ignored by the federal government." Attorney General Scott Pruitt called the decision "troubling" and said that the Supreme Court would have to decide the constitutionality of state bans on same-sex marriage.

Appeal to the Tenth Circuit Court of Appeals
Smith filed a notice of appeal with the Tenth Circuit Court of Appeals on January 16, and asked the court to expedite the appeal process and hear the case along with Kitchen v. Herbert. The same 3-judge panel of the Tenth Circuit that heard oral arguments in Kitchen on April 10 heard oral arguments in Bishop v. Smith on April 17. On July 18, the court upheld the district court's ruling in a 2–1 decision, concluding that Oklahoma's same-sex marriage ban violated the U.S. Constitution, though it immediately stayed its ruling pending disposition of a petition for certiorari by the U.S. Supreme Court. Jeffrey L. Fisher, a law professor at Stanford University and an experienced Supreme Court litigator, joined as lead counsel for those challenging Oklahoma's denial of marriage rights to same-sex couples in August. The Supreme Court rejected Oklahoma's appeal on October 6, 2014, and the Tenth Circuit's ruling subsequently went into effect, thus legalizing same-sex marriage in Oklahoma.

Governor Fallin sharply criticized the Supreme Court's action, but announced that the state would comply and begin licensing and recognizing same-sex marriages. Representative Sally Kern, who had in the past stated that homosexuality was a greater threat to national security than terrorism, decried the court decision, "Oklahoma, or any state for that matter, should not have unelected judges who are not accountable to the people deciding what the laws will be." Scott Hamilton, executive director of a local LGBT group, said "We will be treated the same way as any other couple. And, the property that I have or that he [Hamilton's spouse] has when one of us passes will not be the same rigorous process that an inheritance might. To say that it's a big relief would be an understatement". The Oklahoma County Court Clerk, Tim Rhodes, said in the early afternoon of October 6 that his office was "bustling with activity". Mary Bishop and Sharon Baldwin were the first same-sex couples to receive a marriage license in Oklahoma, doing so at the Tulsa County Courthouse on Monday, October 6 at 1:20 p.m.. Kristen and Heather Dickey were the first couple to receive a license in Cleveland County on October 6.

Native American nations
Same-sex marriage is legal on the reservations of the Cheyenne and Arapaho Tribes, the Cherokee Nation, the Chickasaw Nation, and the Osage Nation. The Cheyenne and Arapaho Tribes were the first Native American tribe in Oklahoma to legalize same-sex marriage. In October 2013, Jason Pickel and Darren Black Bear were issued a marriage license at the tribal courthouse in Concho. While this was the first public same-sex marriage performed on the reservation, tribal officials confirmed that two other same-sex couples had married prior to this. According to tribal law, parties who wish to marry must do so on sovereign land and one party must be a member of the tribes, but the Tribal Code does not specify the gender of the couple. Same-sex marriage is explicitly banned in the Choctaw Nation, the Citizen Potawatomi Nation, the Muscogee (Creek) Nation, and the Seminole Nation.

The Cherokee Nation legalized same-sex marriage on December 9, 2016. In May 2004, a lesbian couple from Owasso, Dawn McKinley and Kathy Reynolds, were issued a marriage license by a tribal court deputy clerk. The tribe quickly placed a moratorium on additional same-sex marriages. On June 14, the Tribal Council passed a law banning same-sex marriage, and the Tribal Council Attorney, Todd Hembree, filed a petition on June 16 in court to nullify the marriage license issued to McKinley and Reynolds. On August 3, 2005, the Judicial Appeals Tribunal in Tahlequah ruled that Hembree lacked standing to sue and could not show that he suffered any harm from the legal recognition of the marriage. In December 2005, the tribunal rejected a second lawsuit challenging the validity of the marriage. In January 2006, the Cherokee Court Administrator, Lisa Fields, responsible for recording marriage licenses, filed a third lawsuit challenging the validity of the marriage. The petition remained unanswered. On December 9, 2016, the Attorney General of the Cherokee Nation, Todd Hembree, who had originally challenged the marriage of McKinley and Reynolds back in 2004, issued an opinion that the same-sex marriage ban was unconstitutional under the Cherokee Nation Constitution, legalizing same-sex marriage in the tribe. Chad Smith, who had served as principal chief of the Cherokee in 2004, welcomed Hembree's opinion, saying, "It as adhering to past Cherokee law. But our constitution incorporates the provisions of the US Constitution, and the Supreme Court (of the United States) has since made its ruling.", referencing the U.S. Supreme Court's decision in Obergefell v. Hodges, which legalized same-sex marriage nationwide in the United States. As a result, McKinley and Reynolds were the first married same-sex couple in the Cherokee Nation. The Osage Nation held a referendum on March 20, 2017 on whether to legalize same-sex marriage on tribal land, and the measure passed with a 52% majority.

The Chickasaw Code was amended on April 18, 2022 to allow marriage between any two individuals and repeal language barring recognition of marriages between persons of the same gender. The definition of marriage now reads: "'Marriage' means a personal relation arising out of a civil contract between two individuals to which the consent of parties legally competent of contracting and of entering into it is necessary, and the Marriage relation shall be entered into, maintained or abrogated as provided by law."

In addition, the Bureau of Indian Affairs operates courts established throughout the U.S. under the Code of Federal Regulations (CFR), and "until such time as a particular Indian tribe establishes their own tribal court, the Court of Indian Offenses will act as a tribe's judicial system". Same-sex marriages can thus be performed in these federal CFR courts for members of the Apache Tribe of Oklahoma, the Caddo Nation of Oklahoma, the Comanche Nation, the Delaware Nation, the Fort Sill Apache Tribe, the Kiowa Indian Tribe of Oklahoma, the Otoe–Missouria Tribe of Indians, the Wichita and Affiliated Tribes, the Eastern Shawnee Tribe of Oklahoma, the Modoc Nation, the Ottawa Tribe of Oklahoma, the Peoria Tribe of Indians of Oklahoma, and the Seneca–Cayuga Nation.

Two-spirit marriages
Many Native American tribes have traditions of two-spirit individuals who were born male but wore women's clothing and performed everyday household work and artistic handiwork which were regarded as belonging to the feminine sphere. This two-spirit status allowed for marriages between two biological males or two biological females to be performed among some of these tribes. They were revered as warriors, directed the traditional scalp dances, were believed to be able to talk to coyotes, and were known for their skills in matchmaking, particularly for young, unmarried men who sought to impress young women. The he'émáné'e often served as a second wife in a married man's polygynous household. Arapaho culture has traditionally recognized two-spirit people who wore women's clothing and were regarded as "esteemed persons with special spiritual powers". Many  married cisgender men without indication of polygyny. They were believed to have been "instructed by the Moon", and would sometimes take men as partners. "The mihxóge were respectfully treated as a special class of religious leaders. Among the late Baxoje, Jiwére-Ñút'achi elders, the mihxóge were still regarded with awe for their spiritual connection and consecrated role in harmony with the Holy Grandfather spirits." Among all these Siouan-speaking peoples, two-spirit people had "visions of female deities or the Moon that served to endorse their identity".

They were sacred and honored annually with a dance in which only those men who had had sexual intercourse with an ayakwa were allowed to participate. The Potawatomi  (plural: mnedokwék) "sought out female company" from an early age, possessed the "work skills" of both sexes, "talked like women", and were regarded as "esteemed persons with special spiritual powers". The Modoc people, exiled to modern-day Ottawa County after the Modoc War, call two-spirit individuals . The tʼwiniˑqʼ wore women's clothing and "behaved as women". They married cisgender men, and usually took the role of a shaman and were credited with great spirit power.

Literature about two-spirit individuals among the Cherokee, Chickasaw and Choctaw is more limited. It is likely that these societies did have a designation like two-spirit, but a lot of traditional knowledge was lost during the Trail of Tears and the adoption of Christianity. Among the Cherokee,   (asegi udando) refers to people who either fall outside of men's and women's roles or who occupy both men's and women's roles. Choctaw author LeAnne Howe stated in a 2022 book, "Often they weren't just involved with other men but had many levels of relationships. They were also involved with our community in very special ways. They could be healers. They're people that protected our children because they embodied more than one thing. And what is part of Choctawan aesthetics is that we revere things that are unusual. Different. When you look at the spirit that's connected in [ohoyo holba], and when they put on that dress in olden times, they are saying 'the embodiment of many'." Some female-bodied two-spirit individuals use the term . These modern terms usually tend to mean a gay, lesbian, or transgender person, though some two-spirit people do identify with these terms.

Demographics and marriage statistics
Data from the 2000 U.S. census showed that 5,763 same-sex couples were living in Oklahoma. By 2005, this had increased to 8,159 couples, likely attributed to same-sex couples' growing willingness to disclose their partnerships on government surveys. Same-sex couples lived in all counties of the state, except Cimarron, and constituted 0.7% of coupled households and 0.4% of all households in the state. Most couples lived in Oklahoma, Tulsa and Cleveland counties, but the counties with the highest percentage of same-sex couples were Roger Mills (0.70% of all county households) and Pushmataha (0.65%). Same-sex partners in Oklahoma were on average younger than opposite-sex partners, and more likely to be employed. However, the average and median household incomes of same-sex couples were lower than different-sex couples, and same-sex couples were also far less likely to own a home than opposite-sex partners. 26% of same-sex couples in Oklahoma were raising children under the age of 18, with an estimated 4,075 children living in households headed by same-sex couples in 2005.

Data from the United States Census Bureau showed that there were 5,006 married same-sex couples in Oklahoma in 2020, including 3,149 female couples and 1,857 male couples. Married couples accounted for 56.3% of all same-sex couples living in the state. Married same-sex spouses were on average younger than different-sex spouses and typically had higher incomes.

Public opinion

See also
LGBT rights in Oklahoma
Same-sex marriage in the Tenth Circuit
Same-sex marriage in the United States

References

2014 in LGBT history
2014 in Oklahoma
LGBT in Oklahoma
Oklahoma